The Royal Exeter Hotel is a Grade II listed building in Bournemouth, Dorset.

It stands opposite the Bournemouth International Centre.

History 

A wing of the hotel was originally built as a house for Lewis Tregonwell, the founder of Bournemouth.

References 

Hotels in Dorset
Buildings and structures in Bournemouth
Buildings and structures completed in 1812
Regency architecture in England
Grade II listed buildings in Dorset
Hotel buildings completed in 1812